The Ministry of Public Works (Excluding Public Undertakings) is a Ministry of the Government of Maharashtra. 
state.

The Ministry is headed by a cabinet level Minister. Ravindra Chavan is Current Minister of Public Works (Excluding Public Undertakings) Government of Maharashtra.

Head office

List of Cabinet Ministers

\

List of Ministers of State

References 

State Public Works Departments of India
Government ministries of Maharashtra